Bombay Girl is a 1994 Hindi-language pop album by Indipop star Alisha Chinai. The album marked a rebranding of the singer from the western image and sound of the platinum-selling Babydoll and Madonna albums for HMV, to a new more wholesome image for Magnasound. It was first released in May 1994 on Cassette and later, in January 1995 on CD.

Track listing 

Notes
 Track 9 to 16 are Bonus Track and only present in Audio CD.

References

1994 albums
Hindi-language albums
Alisha Chinai albums